This article describes the party affiliations of leaders of each member state represented in the European Council during the year 2017. The list below gives the political party that each head of government, or head of state, belongs to at the national level, as well as the European political alliance to which that national party belongs. The states are listed from most to least populous. More populous states have greater influence in the council, in accordance with the qualified majority system.

Summary

List of leaders (1 January 2017)

Changes

See also
Presidency of the Council of the European Union

References

External links
Council of the European Union (official website)

Lists of parties in the European Council